The 2023 Campeonato Paraibano de Futebol is the 113th edition of Paraíba's top professional football league. The competition started on 7 January 2023 and is scheduled to finish on 8 April 2023.

Campinense are defending champions, after winning their 22nd title in 2022.

Format
The format of the competition has been amended from last season, and will feature a group stage where each of the ten teams will face each other once. The top four proceed to a knockout semi-final and final, each over two legs.The bottom two teams in the group stage will be relegated to the second division.

Due to each team having nine games in the group stage, some will have 5 home games and other will have 4 home games, decided by drawing of lots.

The semi-final will be drawn according to finishing places in the group stage. First will play fourth and second will play third, with the higher placed team at home in the second legs. The best performing team in the semi-finals will be at home in the second leg of the final.

Qualification
The two finalists qualify to participate in the 2024 Copa do Brasil, unless they obtain qualification via other means, in which case the place passes to the third-placed team. The champion qualifies to participate in the 2024 Copa do Nordeste. The two best placed teams (other than those already participating in a national league) qualify to participate in the 2024 Campeonato Brasileiro Série D.

Participating teams

Group phase

Semi-final
The semi-finals paired first vs fourth and second vs third from the group stage and were played over two legs, with a penalty shoot-out deciding the tie if results were level. The higher placed team in the group stage were given home advantage in the second leg.

|}

First legs

Second legs

References

Paraíba
2023 in Brazilian football
2023